The 1992–93 Alabama Crimson Tide men's basketball team represented the University of Alabama in the 1992-93 NCAA Division I men's basketball season. The team's head coach was David Hobbs, who was in his first season at Alabama. The team played their home games at Coleman Coliseum in Tuscaloosa, Alabama. They finished the season with a record of 16-13.  The team's conference record was 7-9, which was good enough for fourth place in the SEC Western Division.

The Tide suffered heavy graduation losses in the off-season.  Latrell Sprewell, Robert Horry, and Marcus Webb were all drafted into the NBA, and James Sanders, Bryant Lancaster, and Marcus Campbell all graduated.  Key holdovers were junior guard James "Hollywood" Robinson and sophomore forward Jason Caffey.  Key signees were freshmen Roy Rogers, Bryan Passink, Anthony Brown, and Marvin Orange, and junior college transfer Shon Peck-Love.

The Tide defeated South Carolina in the first round of the 1993 SEC men's basketball tournament final, but lost in the next round to Vanderbilt.  The Tide failed to make the 1993 NCAA tournament, but did receive an invite to the 1993 National Invitation Tournament.  In the first meeting in history between the two Alabama-based schools, the Tide lost in the NIT first round to UAB.

Roster

References 

Alabama Crimson Tide men's basketball seasons
Alabama
Alabama
1992 in sports in Alabama
1993 in sports in Alabama